SS234, SS 234 or SS-234 may refer to:

Military
 USS Kingfish (SS-234), a Gato-class submarine

Transportation
 Strada statale 234 Codognese (SS 234), a former Italian state highway